India has participated in the World Championships in Athletics since 1983. Their first ever medal was Bronze and was won by Anju Bobby George in 2003 Paris; in the Women's long jump discipline.

Medalists

By event

By gender

See also
 Indian records in athletics
 India at the Olympics
 India at the Paralympics

References

External links
 AFI web site
 National Senior Records
 Open National Athletic Championships — Meet Records

Nations at the World Athletics Championships
 
Athletics in India